St. Hubert’s Key is a sacramental in the form of a metal nail, cross, or cone. It was used in Europe until the early 20th century as a traditional cure for rabies and was named for St. Hubert, the patron saint of hunters, mathematicians, opticians and metalworkers.

Description
The key was heated and pressed to the area where a person had been bitten by a dog believed to have rabies. If performed soon after the bite had occurred, the heat had the potential to cauterize and sterilize the wound, eradicating the rabies virus. The practice was endorsed by the Catholic Church (the practice was seldom seen in Orthodox lands), and such keys were used by priests at places with which St. Hubert was associated, where the skin of humans and animals was branded as a protection against the bites of rabid dogs. This practice is recorded in the 1870s in the Ardennes region of France, where dogs were branded with St. Hubert's Key, as "a sure preventative of madness".

References

European culture
History of Europe
Rabies
Traditional medicine